Canberra Stadium (GIO Stadium for commercial reasons) is a facility primarily used for rugby league and rugby union games, located adjacent to the Australian Institute of Sport in Canberra, the capital of Australia. It is the largest sports venue by capacity in Canberra.

History
The facility was designed by architect Philip Cox and constructed by Leighton Contractors. It opened on 29 October 1977.

In 1977, it was the venue for the Pacific Conference Games, and was also was the venue for the 4th IAAF World Cup in Athletics. At the latter meet, the still-current world record for the women's 400m was recorded by East German Marita Koch, and a world record for the women's 4 × 100 m relay was set by East Germany, which stood until the 2012 London Olympic Games.

In the late 1980s, the running track was removed and the warm-up track next door upgraded. New offices, seating, and photo-finish facilities were added. In the 1990 NSWRL season, the reigning NSWRL premiers the Canberra Raiders moved to Bruce Stadium from Seiffert Oval in Queanbeyan, their home ground since entering the New South Wales Rugby League in 1982. The Raiders won their second straight premiership in 1990.

The removal of the athletics track meant that Australian rules football games, more specifically those of the Australian Football League (AFL), could be played at the ground, resulting in pre-season matches being scheduled as early as 1990. In 1995, an AFL match for premiership points was contested between the West Coast Eagles and Fitzroy. There were also a number of pre-season AFL games played at the venue, mostly featuring the Sydney Swans.

Also around that time, a cricket pitch was placed in the centre of the ground as an experiment, and a day/night one-day cricket match was played between two local teams before a small crowd. Regular cricket matches on the ground did not eventuate.

Further renovations occurred in 1997, in preparation for staging soccer matches as part of the 2000 Summer Olympics in Sydney, which shrank the size of the playing field, preventing any future Australian rules football games being played there. The final cost of the renovations was more than seven times what had been originally anticipated by the Territory government of the time, and the subsequent controversy ended the career of then Chief Minister Kate Carnell. During the lead-up, unseasonal snow fell on 28 May 2000, during a match between the Raiders and the Wests Tigers, the only such occasion in National Rugby League history, with the snow causing frost damage to the turf intended for the Olympic soccer tournament.

Olympic soccer in 2000 initiated a stadium facelift, converting the playing surface from oval to rectangular and bringing the crowd closer to the action. It is now an all-seater rectangular stadium with two main grandstands on either side of the playing field. The major disadvantage of that revamp was that the stadium could no longer host AFL games. All top-class cricket and Australian rules football games in Canberra are now staged at the 15,000-capacity Manuka Oval.

A 2008 Rugby League World Cup game between Scotland and France was played at Canberra Stadium, the first ever rugby league test played at the venue. France defeated Scotland 36–16.

In 2009, there was an A-League bid from Canberra that, if successful would have seen an A-League soccer team play at the stadium starting with the 2010–11 season. However, the League decided that the new teams would be Sydney Rovers FC (which dissolved due to financial problems) and Melbourne Heart FC.

In January 2014, Canberra Stadium was rebranded GIO Stadium as part of a naming rights deal with GIO.

A new video screen was installed at the southern end of the stadium in March 2020.

Ownership
The stadium is currently owned by the Australian Government through the Australian Sports Commission and leased to the Government of the Australian Capital Territory. While the current lease is due to expire in 2010, the ACT Government is seeking ownership of the stadium through a land transfer with the Australian Government.

Seating and capacity
Capacity is a nominal all-seated 25,011, the largest crowd being 28,753 for the 2004 Super 12 Final. The main grandstand is named after Canberra Raiders and Australian rugby league player Mal Meninga, and a statue of another Raiders and Australian league representative Laurie Daley adorns the main grandstand entrance.

The eastern grandstand was named the Gregan/Larkham Grandstand on 28 April 2007, after Brumbies and Australia rugby union greats George Gregan and Stephen Larkham. Both ended their international careers after the 2007 Rugby World Cup as the two most-capped players in Wallabies history (at that time), with Gregan at a world-record 139 and Larkham at 102.

Crowd records

Possible replacement 
Whilst the stadium suits the needs of its two current primary tenants, as of 2017 it is the smallest Super Rugby stadium and only a medium-sized NRL venue. The stadium itself is approaching 35 years old, and despite modernisations over the years is lacking in certain amenities for fans – especially covered seating.

Additionally, Australia had bid for the 2022 FIFA World Cup and Canberra Stadium does not meet the necessary criteria to host matches. As such, the ACT Government launched a study examining the upgrade or replacement of Canberra Stadium, with options ranging from increasing capacity and enclosing the current facility, to completely re-configuring the current stadium to an oval for cricket and Australian rules football and building a state of the art rectangular facility next door.

Citing costs of building multiple facilities as an issue, ACT Sports Minister Andrew Barr indicated his preference would be a 'super stadium' built with World Cup standard facilities and capacity, able to be reduced to approximately 30,000 seats after the event. Such a facility would have to incorporate movable seating in order to accommodate all of the major Australian sporting codes.

The official bid for the 2022 World Cup indicated that the 'super stadium' plan was unlikely and the original plan of a new rectangular stadium built next door to the current stadium, with the existing facility re-configured for oval field sports, was considered to be the likely outcome.

After the failed World Cup bid a new rectangular covered stadium was proposed for Canberra. In 2013 the ACT government announced plans to build a 30,000 covered (with a roof similar to Forsyth Barr Stadium) rectangular stadium in the city on the shores of Lake Burley Griffin. It would be part of a 15-year significant redevelopment of the foreshore which extends the city to the Eastern Basin. Along with the stadium, as part of the redevelopment there would be apartments, a convention centre and an urban beach. Plans to build a new stadium have, however, been put on hold indefinitely due to the need for funds to compensate local residents over an asbestos home insulation debacle. Plans to construct the new stadium have since been pushed back by a decade.

Other notable events 
 City vs Country rugby league match, 1981. City defeated Country 38-7 in front of 17,490 fans.
 In 1990, the stadium hosted an International Rules match (a combination of Gaelic football and Australian rules football) between Ireland and Australia. Ireland defeated Australia 52-31 in front of 7,000 fans.
 In 1992 the touring Great Britain Lions defeated the Canberra Raiders 24-12 in front of 4,728 fans.
 In 1995, the AFL's ailing Fitzroy Football Club played one home game against the West Coast Eagles at the venue. West Coast defeated Fitzroy 12.10 (82) to 8.6 (54) in front of 11,282 on 27 May.
 The 2nd leg of the 1996 OFC Nations Cup Final
 Super 12 Rugby union Final 2000, 2001, 2004
 Super Rugby AU Rugby union Final 2020
 Four group matches from the 2003 Rugby World Cup.
 The 2008 Pacific Schools Games
 One Group Match from the 2008 Rugby League World Cup.
 On 19 April 2013 the Stadium hosted the 2013 Anzac Test, the first time the Kangaroos had played a test in Canberra. Canberra Stadium was awarded the test as part of Canberra's centenary celebrations.
 Kanga Cup International youth soccer tournament.
 On 5 May 2017 the Stadium hosted the 2017 Anzac Test. This was the last Anzac Test to be played.
 Hosted three Group Matches from the 2017 Rugby League World Cup including the first Australia vs France test in Australia since 1994.

Concerts & International Matches

References

External links

Official site

Athletics (track and field) venues in Australia
A-League Men stadiums
A-League Women stadiums
Baseball venues in Australia
ACT Brumbies
Defunct athletics (track and field) venues
Defunct Australian Football League grounds
Olympic football venues
Philip Cox buildings
Rugby league stadiums in Australia
Rugby League World Cup stadiums
Rugby union stadiums in Australia
Rugby World Cup stadiums
Soccer venues in Canberra
Sports venues completed in 1977
Sports venues in Canberra
Venues of the 2000 Summer Olympics
1977 establishments in Australia
Canberra City FC
Canberra Cosmos FC